Unión Deportiva Ciudad de Torredonjimeno is a Spanish football team based in Torredonjimeno, in the autonomous community of Andalusia. Founded in 2009 as a replacement for dissolved Torredonjimeno CF, it plays in Tercera División RFEF – Group 9, holding home matches at Estadio Municipal Matías Prats, which holds a capacity of 4,500 people.

Season to season

5 seasons in Tercera División
1 season in Tercera División RFEF

References

External links
La Preferente team profile 
Soccerway team profile

Football clubs in Andalusia
Association football clubs established in 2009
2009 establishments in Spain
Province of Jaén (Spain)